The Grand Prix of Maykop was an elite women's professional one-day road bicycle race held in Maykop, Russia, between 2012 and 2015. It was rated by the Union Cycliste Internationale (UCI) as a 1.2 race.

Past winners

References 

 
Cycle races in Russia
Women's road bicycle races
Sport in Maykop
Recurring sporting events established in 2012
2012 establishments in Russia
Recurring sporting events disestablished in 2015
2015 disestablishments in Russia